The orders and decorations conferred upon civilians and military personnel in the Republic of the Philippines are listed by orders of precedence. Philippine civilian orders and decorations are conferred by the President of the Philippines in his or her capacity as head of state. In certain instances, the conferment of certain orders and decorations requires the concurrence of the Congress of the Philippines, or of certain advisory bodies.

Order of Wear 
Decorations are ranked by the Order of Wear in the Implementing Rules and Regulations of Executive Order No. 236 (Honors Code of the Philippines) as follows:

 Honors of the Philippines (Presidential Awards enumerated in E.O. No. 236)
 Other Presidential Awards (Presidential Awards not enumerated in E.O. No. 236)
 Service award of the Agencies of the National Government
 Decorations and Medals of the Uniformed Services (Armed Forces of the Philippines, Philippine National Police, Philippine Coast Guard)
 Commemorative Medals of the Philippines
 Commemorative Awards of the Agencies of the National Government
 Insignia of the Order of the Knights of Rizal
 Decorations of the Reserves and Auxiliaries of the AFP, PNP, and Coast Guard
 Insignia of Other Philippine Chivalric orders, Fraternal Societies, and Professional Associations
 Foreign Orders, Decorations and Medals
 Insignia of Foreign Chivalric Orders, Fraternal Societies, and Professional Associations

Civilian Decorations
The civilian Order of precedence, established by the Honors Code of the Philippines, is as follows:

First Class Rank
 Quezon Service Cross (Cruz de Servicio a la Republica "Presidente Manuel Quezon") 

Second Class Rank
 Order of Lakandula (Orden de Cacique Lacandula)
 Order of Sikatuna (Orden de Cacique Sicatuna)
 Philippine Legion of Honor (Legion de Honor Filipino)

Third Class Rank
  Order of Gabriela Silang

Fourth Class Rank
 Order of National Artists
 Order of National Scientists
 Order of National Social Scientists
 Gawad sa Manlilikha ng Bayan
 Order of Lakandula - Special Class of Champion for Life

Fifth Class Rank
 Gawad Mabini (Medalla Apolinario Mabini al servicios de Relaciones Exteriores)

Sixth Class Rank
 Order of the Golden Heart (Orden del Corazón Dorado)

Seventh Class Rank
 Presidential Medal of Merit (Medalla de Merito Presidencial)

Eighth Class Rank/Outside the official order of precedence
Order of Lapu-Lapu (Orden de Cacique Lapu-Lapu)

Awards and Decorations of the Armed Forces of the Philippines

These are military decorations which recognize service and personal or unit accomplishments of members and units of the Armed Forces of the Philippines (Philippine Army, Philippine Air Force, Philippine Navy and Philippine Marine Corps).

Military Personnel Decorations

  Medal of Valor
  Philippine Legion of Honor
 Chief Commander (CCLH)
 Grand Commander (GCLH)
 Grand Officer (GOLH)
 Commander (CLH)
 Officer (OLH)
 Legionnaire (LLH)
  Outstanding Achievement Medal
  Distinguished Conduct Star
  Distinguished Service Star
Gawad Sa Kapayapaan
 Gold Cross
 Distinguished Aviation Cross
 Distinguished Navy Cross
 Silver Cross
 Meritorious Achievement Medal
 Distinguished Service medal
 Chairman of the Joint Chiefs of Staff, AFP Commendation Medal and Ribbon 
  Gawad sa Kaunlaran
  Bronze Cross
  Silver Wing Medal
  Wounded Personnel Medal
  Military Merit Medal
 Combat - Spearhead
 Achievement/Service - Anahaw
  Sagisag ng Ulirang Kawal
  Military Civic Action Medal
  Parangal sa Kapanalig ng Sandatahang Lakas ng Pilipinas
  Military Commendation Medal
  Armed Forces Conduct Medal
 Command Reservist (Volunteer) Officer and (Volunteer) Englishted Personnel of the Year Medal and Ribbon
 Annual Efficiency "E" Award for Naval Vessels

Civilian Para-military Personnel Decorations

  Kagitingan Sa Barangay

 Category of Lakan
 Category of Datu
 Category of Maginoo

Civilian Defense Personnel Decorations

 Civilian Employee's Honorary and Incentive Award
  Distinguished Honor Medal
  Superior Honor Medal
 Civilian Merit Medal

Military Unit Decorations
 Philippine Republic Presidential Unit Citation Badge (PRPUCB)
 Martial Law Unit citation
 People Power I Unit citation
 People Power II Unit citation

Civilian Para-military Unit Decorations
 Barangay Presidential Unit citation Badge (BPUCB)

Military Service Medals and Ribbons
 Long Service medal
 American Defense Medal & Ribbon
 Asiatic-Pacific Campaign Medal & Ribbon
 World War II Victory Medal & Ribbon
 Philippine Defense Medal & Ribbon
 Philippine Liberation Medal & Ribbon
 Resistance Movement Medal
 Jolo Campaign medal & Ribbon
 Philippine Independence Medal
 Anti-Dissidence Campaign medal & Ribbon
 Luzon Anti-Dissidence Campaign medal & Ribbon
 Visayan Anti-Dissidence Campaign medal & Ribbon
 Mindanao Anti-Dissidence Campaign medal & Ribbon
 Philippine Korean Campaign medal
 United Nations Service Medal & Ribbon
 Vietnam Service Medal & Ribbon
  Disaster Relief & Rehabilitation Operation Ribbon

Awards and Decorations of the Philippine Coast Guard Auxiliary
To recognize Unit and Individual achievements made by its members; the PCGA, with the guidance of the PCG, adopted a system of awards and decorations.

Personal Decorations
 Coast Guard Auxiliary Outstanding Achievement Medal
 Coast Guard Auxiliary Distinguished Service medal
 Coast Guard Auxiliary Merit Medal
 Coast Guard Auxiliary Search and Rescue Medal
 Coast Guard Auxiliary Commendation Medal
 Coast Guard Auxiliary Civic-Action Medal
 Coast Guard Auxiliary Red Cross Medal
 Coast Guard Auxiliary Good Conduct Medal

Service Medals & Ribbons
 Coast Guard Auxiliary Long Service medal
 Coast Guard Auxiliary Anti-Marine Pollution Campaign medal
 Coast Guard Auxiliary Disaster Relief and Rehabilitation Operations Medal
 Coast Guard Auxiliary National Convention Medal
 Coast Guard Auxiliary International Convention Medal
 Coast Guard Auxiliary World Clean-up Day Campaign medal

Unit Decorations
 Philippine Republic Presidential Unit Citation Badge
  Philippine Coast Guard Commandant Unit citation Ribbon
 National Director PCGA Unit citation Ribbon

Awards and Decorations of the Philippine National Police
The Philippine National Police recognizes individual efficiency, gallantry in the face an enemy, and meritorious accomplishments of its personnel by awarding decorations and medals.

The awards and decorations of the PNP are patterned after the Orders and Medals of the AFP with regard to its lineage from the Philippine Constabulary and the Integrated National Police which were fore-runners of this service branch and previously under the AFP.

Constabulary and INP awards/decorations are authorized for PNP Personnel had they been assigned with the Philippine Constabulary and the INP prior to the transition.

Law Enforcement Personal Decorations
 Medalya ng Kagitingan (PNP Medal of Valor) (Medalla al Valor de la Policia Nacional)
 Medalya ng Kabayanihan (PNP Distinguished Conduct Medal) (Medalla de Policia "Gestion Distinguida")
 Medalya ng Katapatan sa Paglilingkod (PNP Distinguished Service Medal) (Medalla de Servicio Policial Distinguido)
 Medalya ng Katapangan (PNP Bravery Medal)
 Medalya ng Katangitanging Gawa (PNP Outstanding Achievement Medal)
 Medalya ng Pambihirang Paglilingkod (PNP Special Service Medal) (Medalla de Servicio Especiales de la Policia)
 Medalya ng Kadakilaan (PNP Heroism Medal) (Medalla de Heroismo Policial)
 Medalya ng Katangitanging Asal (PNP Outstanding Conduct Medal)
 Medalya ng Kagalingan (PNP Medal of Merit) (Medalla al Merito Policial)
  Medalya ng Kasanayan (PNP Efficiency Medal) (Medalla de Eficiencia de la Policia Nacional)
  Medalya ng Papuri (PNP Commendation Medal)
 Medalya ng Sugatang Magiting (PNP Wounded Personnel Medal)
 Medalya ng Ugnayang Pampulisya (PNP Police Relations Medal)
  Medalya ng Mabuting Asal (PNP Good Conduct Medal)
 Medalya ng Paglilingkod (PNP Service medal)

Law Enforcement Unit Decorations
 Philippine Republic Presidential Unit Citation Badge (PRPUCB) (Citacion Presidencial - Mencion Honorifica del Unidad de la Policia Nacional)
 Martial Law Unit citation
 People Power I Unit citation
 People Power II Unit citation

Law Enforcement Service Medals and Ribbons
  Medalya ng Paglaban sa Manliligalig (PNP Anti-dissidence Campaign medal)
  Medalya ng Pagtulong sa Nasalanta (PNP Disaster Relief and Rehabilitation Operations Campaign medal)
  Medalya ng Paglilingkod sa Luzon (PNP Luzon Campaign medal)
 Medalya ng Paglilingkod sa Visayas (PNP Vizayan Campaign medal)
 Medalya ng Paglilingkod sa Mindanao (PNP Mindanao Campaign medal)
 Medalya ng Kagalingan (PNP Merit Medal)
 Medalya ng Papuri (PNP Commendation Medal)

Constabulary Personnel Decorations
 Constabulary Medal of Valor
 Distinguished Conduct Star
 Distinguished Service Star

Constabulary Service Medals and Ribbons
 Long Service Medal
 Luzon Campaign medal
 Visayas Campaign medal
 Mindanao and Sulu Campaign medal
 Constabulary WWI Victory Medal
 National Guard WWI Victory Medal

Awards and Decorations of the Bureau of Jail Management and Penology 
After the creation of the PNP Act of 1991 transferred control of the Philippine National Police, Bureau of Jail Management and Penology, and the BFP Bureau of Fire Protection  from the Armed Forces to the Department of the Interior and Local Government, the Bureau of Jail Management and Penology established its own system of awards and decorations modeled on the PNP.

Medalya ng Kagitingan
Medalya ng Kabayanihan 
Medalya ng Kagalingan 
Medalya ng Natatanging Gawa 
Medalya ng Kadakilaan 
Medalya ng Sugatang Magiting 
Medalya ng Katapatan sa Paglilingkod 
Medalya ng Katapatan 
Medalya ng Kasanayan 
Medalya ng Papuri 
Medalya ng Paglilingkod 
Medalya ng Pambihirang Paglilingkod 
Medalya ng Katangi-tanging Asal 
Medalya ng Ugnayang Pangkumunidad 
Medalya ng Mabuting Asal 
Medalya ng Paglilingkod sa Luzon
Medalya ng Paglilingkod sa Visayas 
Medalya ng Paglilingkod sa Mindanao 
Ribbon ng Natatanging Unit 
Ribbon ng Tagapagsanay
Ribbon ng Pagtulong sa Nasalanta

Dormant orders and awards
The consolidation of the Philippine honors system in 2003 led to the government discontinuing of the awarding of many honors. These honors and awards shall remain extant during the lifetime of the last holder of the respective awards, and shall continue to enjoy the rights and privileges thereof. Upon the death of the last living recipient, the respective affected awards shall cease to exist and be discontinued.

 Medal of Honor
 Rizal Collegiate Palms
 Mabini Teachers Medal
 Rizal Pro Patria Award
 Presidential Citation for Honesty and Integrity
 Order of the Grieving Heart
 Presidential Award in Education
 Order of Kalantiao
 Republic Cultural Heritage Award
 Presidential Citation for Outstanding Humanitarian Services
 International Artist
 Bayani ng Bagong Republika
 Presidential Citation for Outstanding Service to Philippine Democracy
 Presidential Award for Heroism in Times of Disaster
 Sajid Bulig Presidential Award for Heroism
 Presidential Mineral Industry Environment Award

See also
 Philippines campaign medals
 Awards and decorations of the Armed Forces of the Philippines
 Knights of Rizal
 Ramon Magsaysay Award
 Royal and Hashemite Order of the Pearl of Sulu

References

External links

 Amending the Honors Code to clarify the proclamation of National Artists
 Administrative Order No. 128, approving Implementing Rules and Regulations
 Republic Act 646

This article incorporates public domain text from the library of the Congress of the Philippines.